Rex is a Slovak police procedural drama, based on the Austrian drama Inspector Rex. The television series commenced in 2017 on Slovak television channel Markíza. The show follows the German Shepherd police dog Rex, his partners, and the rest of the team in Bratislava as they work together to solve crimes. Rex is played by three different dogs, originating from Poland. In November 2017, it was announced that Rex was being renewed for a second series.

References

External links
 
 Rex at csfd.cz 

Television shows about dogs
Television shows set in Slovakia
Fictional dogs
2017 Slovak television series debuts
2010s Slovak television series
Markíza original programming